DJ Eric's 4th Production

Track listing

 Intro (Estos Piratas)/Remix
 No Paciencia - MC Ceja
 Enterralos - Polaco
 Dale Rewind - Felo Man (El Nene Amenaza)
 Por Que - TNT
 Yale Dime Por Que - Lito & Polaco
 Intro 2
 Don Federico - Don Chezina
 Si Ellas Es Facil - Panty Man
 No Hablas No - Baby Banton
 Desde la Prision - Blanco Flake
 Confinados - Double Flavor
 Muerte Pt. 3 - MC Ceja & Polaco
 Muerte Pt. 3 - Lito & Polaco
 Muerte Pt. 3 - TNT
 Me Introduzco Al Funk - MC Ceja
 Zorra - KID
 Raggamufing - 3 On Mic
 Intro 3 (Funky Scratch)
 Estan Guillao - TNT
 Radio Version

1996 compilation albums